A rail car can be:

 Railcar, a type of self-propelled passenger-carrying railway vehicle.
 Railroad car, another type of railway vehicle, pulled by a locomotive.